Kimbrell (also Kimbrel) is an unincorporated community in Jefferson and Tuscaloosa counties, Alabama, United States. Kimbrell was named in honor of Miles Kimbrell, a storekeeper and sewing machine agent. A post office operated under the name Kimbrel from 1895 to 1905.

Notes

Unincorporated communities in Jefferson County, Alabama
Unincorporated communities in Tuscaloosa County, Alabama
Unincorporated communities in Alabama